The 2017–18 Canisius Golden Griffins men's basketball team represented Canisius College during the 2017–18 NCAA Division I men's basketball season. The Golden Griffins, led by second-year head coach Reggie Witherspoon, played their home games at the Koessler Athletic Center in Buffalo, New York as members of the Metro Atlantic Athletic Conference. They finished the season 21–11, 15–3 in MAAC play to finish in a share for the MAAC regular season title with Rider. It was their first conference regular season title since 1994. As the No. 2 seed at the MAAC tournament, they were upset by in the quarterfinals by No. 7 seed Quinnipiac. They were invited to the College Basketball Invitational where they lost in the first round to Jacksonville State.

Previous season
The Golden Griffins finished the 2016–17 season 18–16, 10–10 in MAAC play to finish in a tie for sixth place. They defeated Marist in the first round of the MAAC tournament to advance to the quarterfinals where they lost to Saint Peter's. They were invited to the CollegeInsider.com Tournament where they lost in the first round to Samford.

Roster

Schedule and results

|-
!colspan=9 style=| Non-conference regular season

|-
!colspan=9 style=| MAAC regular season

|-
!colspan=9 style=| MAAC tournament

|-
!colspan=9 style=| CBI

References

Canisius Golden Griffins men's basketball seasons
Canisius
Canisius